Louise Latimer (March 6, 1913 – June 16, 1973) was an American film actress. She starred opposite John Wayne in the 1937 California Straight Ahead!.

Born in Brooklyn, New York, she graduated from Erasmus Hall High School. On Broadway, Latimer portrayed Jean in The Scene of the Crime (1940) and Lydia in When in Rome (1934). During World War II, she was active with the American Red Cross and various Catholic charities, helping to promote the war effort.

Selected filmography
 There's Always Tomorrow (1934)
 Don't Turn 'Em Loose (1936)
 Grand Jury (1936)
 Two in Revolt (1936)
 Murder on a Bridle Path (1936)
 The Witness Chair (1936)
 Bunker Bean (1936) 
 The Plot Thickens (1936)
 We're on the Jury (1937)
 California Straight Ahead! (1937)
 Wings Over Honolulu (1937)

References

External links
 
 

1913 births
1973 deaths
American film actresses
American expatriates in Spain
20th-century American actresses
People from Brooklyn
Actresses from New York City
Erasmus Hall High School alumni